Villa Panorama is a historic home located in Jefferson City, Cole County, Missouri. It was built in 1907, and is a -story, Colonial Revival style brick dwelling. It sits on a rough ashlar limestone basement and has a slate gambrel roof with dormers.  It features an entrance portico and porte cochere.  Also on the property are the contributing brick carriage house, pump house, and landscaped property with stone grotto.

It was listed on the National Register of Historic Places in 1985.

References

Houses on the National Register of Historic Places in Missouri
Colonial Revival architecture in Missouri
Houses completed in 1907
Buildings and structures in Jefferson City, Missouri
National Register of Historic Places in Cole County, Missouri